Jan Valerián Jirsík (19 June 1798, Kácov – 23 February 1883, České Budějovice) was a Roman Catholic clergyman, who was appointed the fourth Bishop of České Budějovice in 1851.

See also
 133077 Jirsík, asteroid

References

External links
Jan Valerián Jirsík @ Catholic Hierarchy 

1798 births
1883 deaths
People from Kácov
People from the Kingdom of Bohemia
Bishops of České Budějovice
Members of the Austrian House of Deputies (1861–1867)
Members of the Bohemian Diet
19th-century Roman Catholic bishops in Austria-Hungary